Blanca Sánchez (March 2, 1946 – January 7, 2010) was a Mexican character actress, the daughter of Luis Sánchez Silva and Ofelia de la Fuente.

She appeared in several telenovelas such as Quinceañera and Luz y sombra. Her film work included such films as Tiempo de morir, Cuando los hijos se van, Yo soy Chucho el Roto, and Mamá Dolores.

Sánchez died in 2010, aged 63, in Mexico City, from undisclosed causes.

References

External links
 

1946 births
2010 deaths
Mexican film actresses
Mexican television actresses
Mexican people of Spanish descent
Actresses from Mexico City